The 2016–17 Sydney Blue Sox season was the team's sixth season. The Blue Sox competed in the Australian Baseball League (ABL) with five other teams, playing its home games at Blacktown International Sportspark Sydney.

Offseason

Regular season

Standings

Record vs opponents

Game log 

|- bgcolor=#bbffbb
| 1
| 18 November
| 
| 13-4
| C. Anderson
| S. Callegari
| -
| 1-0
| 
|- bgcolor=#bbffbb
| 2
| 19 November (DH 1)
| 
| 2–0
| L. Wilkins
| S. Chambers
| -
| 2-0
|  
|- bgcolor=#bbffbb
| 3
| 19 November (DH 2)
| 
| 3–2
| G. Lim
| M. Williams
| -
| 3-0
| 
|- bgcolor=#ffbbbb
| 4
| 20 November
| 
| 3-7
| J. O’Laughlin
| A. Sookee
| -
| 3-1
| 
|- bgcolor=#ffbbbb
| 5
| 24 November
| @ 
| 4-8
| L. Sosa
| T. Foss
| -
| 3-2
| 
|- bgcolor=#bbffbb
| 6
| 25 November
| @ 
| 10-0
| C. Anderson
| H. Beard
| -
| 4-2
| 
|- bgcolor=#ffbbbb
| 7
| 26 November
| @ 
| 1-4
| J. DeGraaf
| L. Wilkins
| S. Kent
| 4-3
| 
|- bgcolor=#ffbbbb
| 8
| 27 November
| @ 
| 11–21
| J. Lowery
| S. Schueller
| -
| 4-4
| 
|-

|- bgcolor=#bbffbb
| 9
| 2 December
| 
| 6-4
| T. Foss
| M. Lee
| S. Schueller
| 5-4
| 
|- bgcolor=#bbffbb
| 10
| 3 December
|  (DH 1)
| 2-1
| G. Lim
| W. Dennis
| -
| 6-4
| 
|- bgcolor=#bbffbb
| 11
| 3 December
|  (DH 2)
| 2-1
| C. Anderson
| T. Bailey
| J. Guyer
| 7-4
| 
|- bgcolor=#ffbbbb
| 12
| 4 December
| 
| 1-5
| D. Schmidt
| A. Sookee
| -
| 7-5
| 
|- bgcolor=#ffbbbb
| 13
| 9 December
| 
| 0-2
| J. Erasmus
| T. Foss
| R. Searle
| 7-6
| 
|- bgcolor=#bbffbb
| 14
| 10 December (DH 1)
| 
| 6-2
| L. Wilkins
| R. Teasley
| -
| 8-6
| 
|- bgcolor=#bbffbb
| 15
| 10 December (DH 2)
| 
| 9-8
| J. Guyer
| R. Niit
| -
| 9-6
| 
|- bgcolor=#ffbbbb
| 16
| 11 December
| 
| 1-5
| K. Champlin
| C. Oxspring
| R. Searle
| 9-7
| 
|- bgcolor=#ffbbbb
| 17
| 16 December
| @ 
| 4-5
| J. Tols
| S. Schueller
| -
| 9-8
| 
|- bgcolor=#ffbbbb
| 18
| 17 December
| @ 
| 6–7
| K. Honda
| L. Wilkins
| -
| 9-9
| 
|- bgcolor=#ffbbbb
| 19
| 17 December
| @ 
| 0-5
| D. Ruzic
| C. Anderson
| -
| 9-10
| 
|- bgcolor=#ffbbbb
| 20
| 18 December 
| @ 
| 0-5
| J. Kennedy
| C. Oxspring
| -
| 9-11
| 
|- bgcolor=#ffbbbb
| 21
| 29 December
| 
| 3-4
| M. Hamburger
| J. Guyer
| P. Moylan
| 9-12
| 
|- bgcolor=#bbffbb
| 22
| 30 December
| 
| 9-2
| C. Anderson
| J. Guthrie
| -
| 10-12
| 
|- bgcolor=#ffbbbb
| 23
| 31 December
| 
| 4-6
| P. Moylan
| S. Schueller
| -
| 10-13
| 
|-

|- bgcolor=#ffbbbb
| 24
| 1 January
| 
| 1-4
| J. Kennedy
| Y. Katayama
| V. Vasquez
| 10-14
| 
|- bgcolor=#bbffbb
| 25
| 5 January
| @ 
| 3-0
| T. Foss
| C. Lourey
| T. Van Steensel
| 11-14
| 
|- bgcolor=#ffbbbb
| 26
| 1 January
| @ 
| 7-8
| B. Grice
| T. Van Steensel
| -
| 11-15
| 
|- bgcolor=#ffbbbb
| 27
| 7 January
| @ 
| 8-10
| M. Lee
| T. Grattan
| W. Saupold
| 11-16
| 
|- bgcolor=#ffbbbb
| 28
| 8 January
| @ 
| 6-7
| J. Bowey
| A. Sookee
| -
| 11-17
| 
|- bgcolor=#ffbbbb
| 29
| 12 January
| @ 
| 4-9
| K. Champlin
| T. Foss
| -
| 11-18
| 
|- bgcolor=#bbffbb
| 30
| 13 January
| @ 
| 10-9
| J. Guyer
| Z. Treece
| T. Van Steensel
| 12-18
| 
|- bgcolor=#ffbbbb
| 31
| 14 January
| @ 
| 6-7
| S. Holland
| L. Wilkins
| R. Searle
| 12-19
| 
|- bgcolor=#bbbbbb
| 32
| 4 January
| @ 
| PPD–RAIN
| -
| -
| -
| -
| 
|- bgcolor=#ffbbbb
| 33
| 20 January
| 
| 3-5
| T. Atherton
| G. Lim
| -
| 12-20
| 
|- bgcolor=#bbffbb
| 34
| 21 January (DH 1)
| 
| 5-1
| L. Wilkins
| S. Guinard
| -
| 13-20
| 
|- bgcolor=#ffbbbb
| 35
| 21 January (DH 2)
| 
| 1-2
| L. Cohen
| C. Anderson
| S. Kent
| 13-21
| 
|- bgcolor=#bbffbb
| 36
| 22 January
| 
| 7-6
| Y. Katayama
| S. Kent
| -
| 14-21
| 
|- bgcolor=#bbffbb
| 37
| 26 January
| @ 
| 5-4
| V. Harris
| J. O’Loughlin
| T. Van Steensel
| 15-21
| 
|- bgcolor=#ffbbbb
| 38
| 27 January
| @ 
| 2-5
| S. Callegari
| C. Anderson
| H. Lee
| 15-22
| 
|- bgcolor=#ffbbbb
| 39
| 28 January
| @ 
| 3-15
| D. Barker
| L. Wilkins
| -
| 15-23
| 
|- bgcolor=#ffbbbb
| 40
| 29 January
| @ 
| 3-4
| K. Hampton
| Y. Katayama
| H. Lee
| 15-24
| 
|- bgcolor=#DC0118
| 41
| 30 January
| @  (makeup)
| CANCELLED
| -
| -
| -
| -
| 
|-

Roster

References 

Sydney Blue Sox
Sydney Blue Sox